Mind Your Back, Professor is a 1977 Danish comedy film directed by Jens Okking and starring Ulf Pilgaard.

Cast

References

External links

1977 films
Danish comedy films
1970s Danish-language films
1977 comedy films
Films directed by Jens Okking